St Albans City Football Club (nicknamed The Saints) is a semi-professional football club based in St Albans, Hertfordshire, England. The club currently competes in the National League South (previously known as the Conference South), the sixth tier of English football. It was founded in 1908 and plays its home matches at Clarence Park, about 800 yards from the city centre.

It competed in the Conference Premier (now the National League) during the 2006–07 season, but was relegated back to the Conference South after one season and subsequently suffered a further relegation in 2010–11, before returning to the sixth tier in 2013–14 after beating Chesham United FC 3–1 in the play-off final.

History

Early history 
Formed in April 1908, St Albans City FC became members both the Spartan League Eastern Division and the Herts County League Western Division. City were champions of the Spartan League Eastern Division and the Herts County League Western Division in 1909–10. St Albans joined the Athenian League in 1920 and won the Athenian League in 1920-21 and 1921–22.

City's most famous match was arguably on 22 November 1922 in a fourth round qualifying FA Cup match. Having been held by Dulwich Hamlet to a 1–1 draw at Clarence Park on 18 November, the replay drew a gate of 4,060. City's New Zealand-born goalkeeper W. Tennant did not appear, his place taken by Alf Fearn who was usually a half-back with the reserves. Dulwich put eight goals past him, the winning goal coming in near darkness at the end of extra time. What put the game in the record books was that City scored seven times, with all seven goals being scored by Wilfred Minter. His feat remains the highest tally by a player on the losing side of an FA Cup tie.

St Albans joined the Isthmian League in 1923 and won it in 1923–24, 1926–27 and 1927–28. City were runners-up in the Isthmian League in 1954–55. In 1973–74, the Saints were relegated from the Isthmian League Premier Division to Division Two along with Corinthian Casuals, being the first clubs to be relegated within the Isthmian League. Division Two was renamed Division One in 1977–78, and in 1982–83, St Albans were relegated to the new Division Two. However, City were promoted back to Division One a year later, with a second promotion to the Isthmian League Premier Division occurring in 1985–86. St Albans were semi-finalists in the 1998-99 FA Trophy, losing 4–3 over two legs to Forest Green Rovers. In the 2003–04 Isthmian League, St Albans finished 19th in the Isthmian League, but due to a restructuring, they participated in a playoff for a position in the newly formed Conference South. They won the playoff, beating Heybridge Swifts 4-3 and Bedford Town 5–4.

Promotion to the Conference

On 7 May 2006, St Albans City beat Histon 2–0, in the 2005/2006 Conference South Play-off Final at Stevenage's Broadhall Way ground. Goals from Lee Clarke and Paul Hakim meant that St Albans was promoted to the Conference National for the first time.

Following the team's promotion, Clarence Park was redecorated and improved slightly, a noticeable difference being the acquisition of a new club sponsor, as well as new advertising boards. There were rumours at the time of the promotion that St Albans were possibly moving to a larger venue. However, nothing was confirmed or denied.

2006–07 season

The Saints' first three games in the Conference were a mixed affair, with the team winning, drawing and losing their first three games respectively. After then St Albans had a poor run of games and were hovering around the relegation zone. Their hopes being restricted by being a part-time team whilst going up against full-time opponents. However, Colin Lippiatt remained positive about his team's chances. Having been knocked out in the FA Cup 4th Qualifying Round by Yeading, the team's concentration was focused on staying in the Conference.

St Albans started the second half of the season just one place off the relegation zone. In terms of transfers, The Saints allowed defender Dave Theobald to return to the Conference North team Kettering Town, but they re-signed defender Djoumin Sangare on loan from Grays Athletic until the end of the season. Lippiatt also signed Chris Watters and Leon Archer from neighbours Boreham Wood for an undisclosed fee on two-year contracts.

In January 2007, director (and chief football writer for The Mail on Sunday) Ian Ridley left the club amid disagreement over policy. Ridley argued that the club needed to bring in older, more experienced players (citing Steve Claridge) to bolster the campaign to stay in the Conference; the remainder of the board wanted to maintain a strong reliance of "young, hungry" players.
St Albans continued throughout the new year with a run of poor results. On 9 April 2007 (Easter Monday), a 1–1 draw with Tamworth guaranteed St Albans relegation from the Conference and the team finished bottom of the table.
The Saints were the first team to be relegated from the Conference, but were later joined by Southport, Tamworth and Altrincham.

In addition to the Saints returning to the Conference South Colin Lippiatt resigned as manager at the end of the season. In a statement he stated that it was 'right and proper' for him to leave. He has since rejoined Conference side Woking (where he was once manager) as a director.

Back to the Conference South
After relegation to the Conference South, St Albans appointed inexperienced Ritchie Hanlon as their new manager, who had only retired through injury in January. He had a huge task to rebuild the squad; Nick Roddis had left the club after finding out that he would not be interviewed for the vacant manager position, Chris Watters rejoined his old club Boreham Wood for a nominal fee, only 5 months after joining the Saints. Goalkeeper Paul Bastock was released by 'mutual consent', later joining Rushden & Diamonds.

More players where to leave Clarence Park as Striker Leon Archer joined Braintree Town and Midfielder Tom Davis joined Lewes, after both made it clear that they did not want to play for St Albans. Dean Cracknell also left the club to join Hemel Hempstead. Hanlon however bolstered the squad with numerous new signings, Gary Burrell joined from Heybridge Swifts, Mark Beard joined from Stevenage Borough as player/assistant manager, Paul Bruce joined from Dagenham & Redbridge & So Solid Crew Rapper, Former AFC Wimbledon player Junior Harvey was recruited, another player from Dagenham & Redbridge was brought in, Nick Eyre, signed to replace Veteran Paul Bastock. This was backed up with two youth signings, Hector Mackie & Reis Noel, and finally Hanlon added Hassan Sulaiman & Paul Semakula to the ranks.

Not long into October after a bad string of results, Richie Hanlon was sacked as St Albans manager. Former Hendon and AFC Wimbledon manager Dave Anderson was given the role, and has since taken City to one win at Bromley and a draw. He has wasted no time in adjusting the squad and has signed Jon Stevenson and Gary O'Connor amongst others. Anderson became another managerial casualty after the 4–0 New Year defeat to Cambridge City.

England U19 scout and former City boss Steve Castle was next put in the position, and he declared his ambition to bring former players of the Saints back to Clarence Park. This prompted rumours of returns for Matt Hann and Patrick Ada amongst others. On 8 January, Castle signed Dean Cracknell and Simon Martin, who are both former Saints.

Things began to look up for the team, with goalkeeper Paul Bastock, who was later voted Player of the Season by fans, rejoining from Rushden and Diamonds, helping City to long unbeaten run. Included in this run of results was the 2–0 victory over top of the league Lewes, thanks to Paul Hakim and a stunner from Lee Clarke, later voted goal of the season. Soon City were on the tail of Weston Super Mare for survival.

With a stunning 3–2 victory over playoff chasers  Eastleigh Town F.C. secured their safety in the Conference South. Eastleigh brought many a fan to Clarence Park with drums and all, and they took the lead when former Saint Matt Hann went down in the box and Eastleigh converted the penalty. The Eastleigh fans went wild, and they maintained the lead and their singing voices until half time. In the second half city loanee Bradley Gray equalised with a shot from the edge of the area that squeezed inside the post, before Akanni-Sunday Wasiu put City ahead moments later. By now the City fans were going crazy, and the result seemed beyond doubt when Sunday completed his brace. Another former Saint, Steve Watts, scored a great effort but City survive in both the game and the lead.

2008–09 season
After retaining many of the previous season's squad, Steve Castle set promotion as a target for the team, after deciding to stay on himself. St Albans did not start brilliantly, failing to win in the first few games. However, the Saints recovered to begin a run of 7 wins to see them climb into the playoff positions. Paul Hakim scored many goals for City during this time, further rekindling his relationship with the fans.
When the run ended, City went on a run of three games without winning, dropping to mid-table.

In the FA Trophy, the Saints saw off Dartford before meeting local rivals Stevenage Borough in the next round. Saints lost 4–1, conceding three goals in the last ten minutes.

2009–10 season – financial worries
In Summer 2009, it was announced that Gibson's building firm, William Verry, were to go into administration with debts mounting continuously. Gibson himself released a statement in regards to the club's future, stating that it was safe. In the month that followed Gibson released another statement regarding the club's finances Following this statement there were rumours of buy outs by a rival building firm who had taken on a number of William Verry's contracts. This apparently was unfounded. Another interested party was apparently Watford central defender Darren Ward.

2010–12
The summer of 2010 went somewhat smoother for the Saints, as the financial worries that had plagued the team in 2009 had, thankfully, not returned, and Steve Castle was able to get on with assembling his squad for the new season, albeit with one of the smallest budgets in the league.

Pre-season friendlies were lined up with the likes of Watford and Leyton Orient, before the Saints kicked off their Conference South season with a trip to Thurrock in mid-August. In the week leading up to the game, City were boosted by the return of former Saints favourites Ben Martin and Hassan Sulaiman, who joined other key players Pete Smith, Paul Bastock and Drew Roberts in the new squad.

City opened their account for the season with a 2–2 draw with the Fleet, with goals from Roberts and the newly improved Inih Effiong setting them up with a two-goal lead, before being pegged back before full-time. Despite missing the chance to win, it was considered a good point away from home, against strong opposition.

With the signing of Adam Martin completed, meaning he joined Robbie and Ben on the club's list of 'Martins', the Saints continued their campaign with the visit of Basingstoke Town. A closely fought encounter ended 0–0, although the Saints had a good chance to scrape the game when Drew Roberts squared for Inih Effiong, only for the big striker to slip in the sodden conditions before firing wide.

The Saints' third match of the season was another home encounter – this time with the much-changed Braintree Town. City's veteran goalkeeper Paul Bastock was in sparkling form to twice deny Braintree from close range, as the Saints ground out another goalless draw. St. Albans' best chance of the game fell to winger Joe Richards, whose close range header was clawed out by the Irons stopper, thus leaving City with three points from three games, and extending their Conference South unbeaten run to four games, including last season's final day draw with Bath City.

On 4 February 2011, the F.A. fined St. Albans £7,500 and deducted 10 league points. The punishment was handed down to City chairman John Gibson and then vice-chairman Alasdair McMillin during a Regulatory Hearing at the Association's offices at Wembley, and was in relation to alleged illegal payments to players, described by the FA as financial irregularities, by the club during the 2008–09 season. St. Albans appealed, but the original decision was upheld.

St. Albans were relegated on 9 April 2011 after losing 4–0 to Ebbsfleet United, they will play in the Southern League Premier Division in season 2011/12

On 12 May 2011, it was announced that local businessmen Lawrence Levy and John Mcgowan had bought the club from previous chairman John Gibson for an undisclosed fee. They revealed that they will be looking for someone with plenty of football knowledge and experience to take over the position of chairman.

On 10 June 2011, manager Steve Castle was released after many weeks of speculation. His successor was announced on 18 June to be former Harrow Borough manager David Howell who has recently taken Harrow to the play-offs in the Isthmian League Premier Division.

2011–2012
Now playing in the Southern League Premier Division for the first time in their history and at their lowest level for over 20 years, the saints weren't considered one of the favourites for the division although a late surge in late Jan and Feb took the club to the brink of the play-offs, however only 1 win in the final 5 games meant St Albans finished 8th.

2012–2013
David Howell started the season with a much improved budget and St Albans were among the favourites for the division signing players like Barry Hayles, despite starting the season well, a slump in October and November which also saw early exits in the FA Cup and FA Trophy saw David Howell sacked and youth team coaches James Gray and Graham Golds take over, initially as a caretaker management team, however the performances improved with some better football and they were given the job full-time. However several players left over the Christmas period and the owners introduced a controversial decision to up the admission prices mid-season. St Albans finished 11th

2013–2014
The 2013–2014 season was a major success with pre-season signings of the calibre of John Frendo who was the league's top scorer the previous season. After an indifferent start that saw St Albans lose 4 games up to the end of September, it was the arrival of Rambir Marwa in midfield that saw a change in fortunes. St Albans made the FA Cup 1st Round for the 1st time since 2002 losing 8–1 at home to Mansfield Town in front of 3000+ supporters and they also made the FA Trophy 2nd Round losing to eventual winners Cambridge United. A new record of away wins without defeat was also set (16). St Albans finished the season 4th and won the play-offs defeating Chesham United 3–1 in the final in front of 2900 fans.

2014–2015
St Albans returned to the Conference South and finished 13th. A strong finish in the last few weeks of the season resulted in joint managers, Jimmy Gray and Graham Golds, receiving the league's manager of the month award.

2021-2022 – FA Cup Run
St Albans were in the hat for the first round of the FA Cup for the first time since 2016. They drew against EFL League Two leaders Forest Green Rovers F.C. The game started poorly for the Saints as Matty Stevens poked the ball past City goalkeeper Michael Johnson for the opening goal. St Albans however had a swift reply by scoring 2 goals scored by Mitchel Weiss and Zane Banton respectively which put the Saints 2-1 up. Just before the end of the first half, Jack Aitchinson scored with a right-footed shot from just inside the box to square the tie. With just over 10 minutes to go, Mitchel Weiss takes advantage of a Kane Wilson slip to square it to Shaun Jeffers who tapped it home into an open net. Then, with 2 minutes left to play, the ball squeezed through a St Albans player to send Matty Stevens through on goal but with a heroic tackle from Dave Diedhiou and a point-blank stop from goalkeeper Michael Johnson, the Saints kept their 3-2 advantage. With a blow of the full-time whistle by the referee, City had gone through to the second round. Most of the 4000 fans spewed onto the pitch to celebrate their victory.

On the 8th of November, St Albans drew against Hertfordshire rivals, Boreham Wood F.C. Unfortunately for the Saints, Boreham Wood beat City 4-0 leading their incredible FA Cup run to an end.

Famous affiliations
Chief sports writer for the Daily Mail Ian Ridley was on the board before leaving over disagreements involving transfer policies and a lack of ambition at the club. In 2011, he was appointed chairman of the club. In 2012 he left his role.

Players

First-team squad

Out on loan

Coaching staff

Honours

League
Conference South (Tier 6)
Runners-up 2005–06
Isthmian League Premier (Tier 6)
Champions (3): 1923–24, 1926–27, 1927–28
Isthmian League Division One (Tier 7)
Winners (1): 1985–86

Cups
 London Senior Cup
Champions (1): 1970–71
 Herts Senior Cup
Champions (9): 1950–51, 1954–55, 1955–56, 1956–57, 1965–66, 1967–68, 1968–69, 1999–00, 2004–05

Records

Scores

Attendances

Former players
1. Players that have played/managed in the Football League or any foreign equivalent to this level (i.e. fully professional league).
2. Players with full international caps.
3. Players that hold a club record or have captained the club.
 Dean Austin
 Laurence Batty
 Omar Beckles
 Allan Cockram
 James Comley
 Andy Driscoll
 Warren Gravette
 Matthew Howard
 Tony Kelly
 Craig Mackail-Smith
 Junior Morias
 Jack Saville
 Billy Stagg
 Dean Williams
 Chris Zoricich
 Desiree Ellis

References

External links

St. Albans at Soccerway

 
Football clubs in England
National League (English football) clubs
City Football Club
Southern Football League clubs
Isthmian League
Athenian League
Football clubs in Hertfordshire
Association football clubs established in 1908
1908 establishments in England